Löwenstein is a city in the district of Heilbronn in Baden-Württemberg, Germany. It was first mentioned in 1123. The castle of Löwenstein served as a residence for the counts of Löwenstein-Wertheim. In 1634 the castle was destroyed by the imperial forces.

References

External links

Towns in Baden-Württemberg
Heilbronn (district)
Cities in Baden-Württemberg